Netflix has contributed substantially to LGBTQ representation in animation throughout the 2010s and 2020s. Lesbian, gay, bisexual, pansexual, and transgender characters have appeared in various animated series, and some animated films on the streaming platform. GLAAD described Netflix as a company taking "impressive strides in viewership and impact," when it came to LGBTQ representation. Examples of original Netflix animated series with a large presence of LGBTQ characters include Kipo and the Age of Wonderbeasts and She-Ra and the Princesses of Power. In January 2021, GLAAD specifically highlighted the She-Ra and the Princesses of Power series finale which confirmed "its lead two characters, Catra and Adora, were queer and in love," and Kipo and the Age of Wonderbeasts which starred Benson, a gay character, and his love interest, Troy.

2010s
Another show that became very prominent was Bojack Horseman, airing from 2014 to 2020 on the streaming service. The show had a number of LGBTQ+ characters. For instance, Kelsey Jannings reveals she had an ex-wife in the episode "Later." The show also featured a married lesbian couple, Mary-Beth and Dr Indria. Gay characters also prominently appeared in BoJack Horseman. Hollyhock, a female teenage horse and Bojack's sister, has eight adoptive fathers (Dashawn Manheim, Steve Mannheim, Jose Guerrero, Cupe Robinson III, Otto Zilberschlag, Arturo "Ice Man" Fonzerelli, Gregory Hsung, and Quackers McQuack) in a consensual polyamorous gay relationship. With this, some critics praised the show for portraying homosexuality in a realist fashion. The show also featured a gay therapist of Bojack, Doctor Champ, and a closeted gay man named Herb Kazzaz."

DreamWorks Dragons, streaming from 2014 to 2018, which features a gay character, Gobber, who is also a double amputee.

Voltron: Legendary Defender, which aired on Netflix from 2016 to 2018, features three gay characters, Shiro, Adam, and Curtis. Shiro and Adam are shown to be romantic partners at first, but eventually break up. Adam dies several years later. In the series finale, Shiro marries Curtis, a background character introduced in Season 7. The series is notably the first to depict an on-screen wedding between two male characters in a Western children's animated series. However, the show was criticized for its treatment of LGBT characters, particularly over Adam's death that occurred in the later half of Season 7. Some claimed the show had followed a stereotype known as "burying that gay", prompting show-runner Joaquim Dos Santos to apologize to fans. More controversy was aimed at the on-screen wedding between Shiro and Curtis, with several critics and viewers characterizing it as poor LGBT representation. Metadeen stated that making a "five-second blip of the wedding...come[s] off as a publicity stunt." On August 13, 2018, show-runner Joaquim Dos Santos posted an apology on his Twitter. He also acknowledged that there were boundaries in place as to how they could portray LGBT representation in the show. Fellow show-runner Lauren Montgomery also acknowledged the limitations regarding LGBT relationships behind the scenes in her apology, saying, "there’s so much that I would do differently, but so little we could’ve done differently."

In the July 2016 season 3 finale of BoJack Horseman, "That Went Well," Todd Chavez confides in his friend Emily that he doesn't think he is either straight or gay, and in fact "might be nothing". He explores the identity further in season 4 and accepts his asexuality, while meeting others who share his orientation.

Big Mouth began airing in September 2017. Dina is a recurring character in the show and was Shannon's love interest until she dumped Shannon in season 3. It also features Lena Foreman, Missy's cousin who is in a relationship with another woman. She is voiced by lesbian actress Lena Waithe. Also appearing in the series is Shannon Glaser, the mother of Jessi Glaser, was married to her husband and did love him, but was shown to be secretly cheating on him by dating cantor Dina Reznick, another woman. 

In an August 2018 episode of Disenchantment, "Castle Party Massacre" it is hinted that Odval and Sorcerio are secretly in a gay relationship, as they secretly host a magic and sex cult when King Zøg is away. IndieWire reviewer Michael Schneider wrote that Sorcerio and Odval have been "a couple for a long time." Another reviewer pointed to an implied gay relationship between two other characters.

In October 2018, a protagonist in Big Mouth, Jay Bilzerian, came out as bisexual. Over a year later, Ali, a pansexual character, was introduced. In the latter case, however, some criticized it as an oversimplification of the "relationship between private parts and gender identity," even as her existence was praised as putting the show ahead of "most television representations of sexual expression." In the fifth season, Jessi Glaser develops a same-sex crush on Ali. However, her sexuality is never labeled afterwards.

Super Drags, a Brazilian show which aired in November 2018, also centered on gay characters. The show focuses on Donizete, Patrick, and Ralph, three gay friends working in a department store, who are also drag queen superheroes, named Scarlet Carmesim, Lemon Chifon, and Safira Cyan are the Super Drags, and are responsible for protecting the LGBTQ community.

In Big Mouth, Matthew MacDell, a flamboyantly gay student with a love of drama and spreading gossip, who is in a relationship with Aiden, the latter introduced as his boyfriend in the Valentine's Day special, entitled "My Furry Valentine." The episode, which aired in early February 2019, was the first episode of the show's third season.

Reggie Abbott, the protagonist of Twelve Forever, which aired in July 2019, has a crush on Conelly, a 13-year-old schoolmate with whom she shares the same taste in imagining and creating stories, as shown in the two-part episode, "Locked Out Forever." Due to the show's abrupt ending, Shadi Petosky, one of the executive producers, stated they won't be able to further explore that aspect of the character/relationship. Elsewhere, Petosky described Reggie as a queer character "coming to terms with her sexuality". The series also included Galaxander, a gay inhabitant of Endless Island, and a gay couple, Mack Beefhouse in the same fantasy world.

An episode of 3Below: Tales of Arcadia, titled "Asteroid Rage," in July 2019, included a lesbian kiss between two characters.

Rocko's Modern Life: Static Cling was released in August 2019. In the original Rocko's Modern Life, Ralph Bighead was the son of Rocko's neighbors. Static Cling, taking place 20 years after the original series, shows that Ralph transitioned to Rachel at some point. The series' creator, Joe Murray, felt that as the new work was about accepting change, including a trans female character would fit naturally into the episode.  The work was a TV movie and sequel to their 1993 series Rocko's Modern Life and the producers worked with GLAAD to ensure that the story of Rachel, as well as a plotline involving her coming out to her parents, Ed and Bev Bighead, was respectful to the LGBTQ+ community and fit within the show itself.

In the third season of The Dragon Prince, which aired in late November 2019, it was revealed that Runaan, the leader of the assassins and father figure to Rayla, is married to a male elf named Ethari.

For instance, the official Twitter account for The Dragon Prince revealed, in late November 2019, in response to a fan inquiry, that Kazi was non-binary and used they/them pronouns. Additionally, She-Ra and the Princesses of Power included a recurring non-binary character named Double Trouble.

Chip and Potato, a preschool series features a gay family named the Razzles, Ray Razzle, his husband Roy Razzle, and their baby twins Ron and Ruby Razzle appeared in the November 2019 episode "Chip's First Piano Exam".

In Fast & Furious Spy Racers which ran from December 2019 to December 2021, has two lesbian characters. Specifically, Tiffany and Wanda are the mothers of Frostee Benson and Sissy Benson.

2020s

Kipo and the Age of Wonderbeasts, which aired from January to December 2020, is another example of expanded LGBT representation in Netflix's selection of animated series. In the first season of Kipo, which streamed on January 10, the character Benson Mekler said outright that he was gay, saying he only liked the series protagonist, Kipo, platonically. He develops a crush on a male character, Troy, in the show's 10th episode. Some noted the show's "casual queerness." Petrana Radulovic of Polygon described Benson's coming out scene as setting a precedent for future programming for all ages, noting that no characters had "actually uttered" the words "I’m gay" in an all-ages animation series, not even in Arthur and She-Ra and the Princesses of Power. Benson remained a character in the show's two remaining seasons, with the romance between Benson, and his new boyfriend, Troy Sandoval (voiced by Giullian Yao Gioiello), as a key sub-plot in the show's last season. The romance between Benson and Troy was praised by reviewers as "perfect" and "charmingly cute." In an interview, series creator Radford "Rad" Sechrist and co-screenwriter Bill Wolkoff confirmed that the characters Benson and Troy were gay, noting that when he had pitched the idea to the studio, Chief Creative Officer Peter Gal approved but instructed the production staff to have the character say the words "I'm gay," something that he and Bill were happy to hear to oblige.

The "Council of Sisters" members Striga and Morana in Castlevania are a lesbian couple as shown in the show's third season, which aired on March 5, 2020. The series also included young Japanese man Taka, who is introduced in the third-season episode "The Reparation of My Heart," and near the season-finale, he and Sumi have sex with Alucard, and shown as gay. On March 10, 2020, Sam Deats, one of the directors of Castlevania, confirmed that the half-vampire son of Dracula, Alucard, was bisexual. 

In May 2020, ND Stevenson, the showrunner of She-Ra and the Princesses of Power stated that while the romantic relationship between Adora and Catra was planned from the show's conception, they weren't sure how overt he could portray it. But throughout each release of the show's subsequent seasons, Stevenson would lay enough groundwork for the approval of the romance. By the time the final season had aired, Stevenson expressed that he was glad that he could finally talk about it, noting that the relationship between Adora and Catra was central to the final season and written in a "very, very textually romantic way". He later said that he had fought hard for Catra and Adora during the show's development. Stevenson later confirmed the romantic relationships between Scorpia and Perfuma, In an interview for Paper, Stevenson said that he and the show staff  "fought very hard for the 'Princess Prom' episode", working to set up a "[queer] framework for the show" in order to normalize it "within the executive structure itself", and had hoped to garner support from its viewers.

Following the premiere of the final season of She-Ra and the Princesses of Power in May 2020, showrunner ND Stevenson confirmed the romantic relationships between Kyle and Rogelio, and between Entrapta and Hordak. In the case of the former, they said that Lonnie is also a part of the relationship as well, implying a possible polyamorous couple.

The Hollow, which aired on Netflix from 2018 to 2020, featured three gay characters. On May 8, 2020, the show's second season premiered on Netflix. The first episode of that season, titled "Home," features one of the show's protagonists, an Asian girl named Mira, was shown to be adopted by her two fathers, Paul and Curtis, and a brother named Miles.  Curtis is a Black man, while Paul is a White man. Paul also appear in two other episodes "Race," "Hollow Games," while Curtis only appears in "Race." The second episode featured a Hispanic boy named Adam, was revealed to homosexual, saying that Mira, a female protagonist, is "not his type" and telling Kai "dude, I'm gay." Prior to this, in the trailer for Season 2 the LGBT pride flag was seen in his room, leading some fans to speculate he was gay. Some critics stated that while this was somewhat clear in season one, there is little or no "romantic entanglement" for the show's characters in the show's second season, with the show focusing on "difficult and dramatic friendships" instead.

On May 21, 2020, ND Stevenson, showrunner of She-Ra and the Princesses of Power, confirmed the romantic relationship between Bow and Glimmer, both of whom are bisexual, as well as the character of Sea Hawk, who was revealed to have been in a relationship with a man, as well as his romantic interest in Princess Mermista.

Rad Sechrist, the showrunner of Kipo and the Age of Wonderbeasts, when asked by a fan about Asher's gender, said, in June 2020, that Asher is non-binary and uses they/them pronouns. This was later confirmed by executive producer Bill Wolkoff.

A mature adult animation, Hoops, which aired in August 2020, included a gay character named Scott on the school's basketball team.

In September 2020, the showrunner of Kipo and the Age of Wonderbeasts, Rad Sechrist, later said that Kipo and Asher together "could be cool," while admitting that he did not think about Kipo being LGBTQ when producing seasons 1 and 2. Sechrist also told fans that he had wanted to do an "entire Benson Dave back story episode" in the second season, clarifying this didn't happen because Benson was gay but rather because they were pushed to focus more on Kipo in the season itself. In another interview, Wolkoff acknowledged that past coming-of-age stories "about kids being gay and dealing with that" often got pushback, but that in this case DreamWorks was open to it. He said that in this case, they got to tell the story they wanted, with DreamWorks supporting them from the beginning, and that they structured story without Benson having to deal with the real "extra weight of homophobia." He noted that writers told him it would be "subversive" to not put Troy and Benson "through hell." Sechrist added that someone noted how gay characters in media often have a "lot of turmoil" and that for people on their crew it was important that the gay relationship "wasn’t a big deal."

The fourth season of Big Mouth dropped on Netflix on December 4, 2020. The season's first episode has the teens heading to a summer camp, with Matthew in his relationship, Jay as bi, and a new character named Natalie el-Khoury, who is a trans female teenager, highlights "various, popular transphobic arguments," while giving her a supportive friend named Jessi, and another named Seth, who rejects her identity, who she rejects.

In the third part of Disenchantment, a show created by Matt Groening, creator of The Simpsons and Futurama, in January 2021, a protagonist was confirmed to be bisexual. Princess Bean, in the part 3 episode "Last Splash," has a same-sex kiss with the mermaid Mora. In the previous season, Bean was shown to enjoy "the company of mermaids." Earlier in the series, Elfo, a male elf, was her love interest. Disenchantment is Matt Groening's first series to have an LGBT lead character, something she shares with her voice actress Abbi Jacobson. Reviewers later said that was confirmed that Bean "is indeed queer" and that she likes mermaids and noted deeper queer themes throughout the show. This includes a married woman casually admitting she is a lesbian, a griffin who has a masculine appearance but is a lady.

The fourth episode of City of Ghosts, which aired in March 2021, "Tovaangar", shows Jasper with two moms. The series also introduced Thomas on March 5, 2021. a 7-year old non-binary child, and skater, who goes by they/them pronouns. Thomas is voiced by transgender child actor Blue Chapman.

The Mitchells vs. the Machines, an animated film, premiered in Netflix in April 2021. The voice actor for one of the film's protagonists, Abbi Jacobson, has stated that Katie is "queer". In the film, Katie wears a rainbow pride flag pin and talks about it taking a while to figure herself out, and at the end of the film, she has a girlfriend at film school in Los Angeles named Jade. The film's writers, Michael Rianda and Jeff Rowe, wrote the character of Katie to be LGBT but without necessarily drawing attention to her sexuality as a lesbian.

The two part animated film, Sailor Moon Eternal, a continuation of the Sailor Moon Crystal series, premiered on Netflix on June 3, 2021. It features Haruka Tenoh (Sailor Uranus) and Michiru Kaioh (Sailor Neptune), two characters in a same-sex relationship, as did the Sailor Moon S (1994), and Sailor Moon SuperS (1995).

On July 4, 2021, We The People, a 10-part series of animated music videos premiered on Netflix. It was created by Chris Nee, a lesbian woman who created many preschool animations like Doc McStuffins and Ridley Jones, with Kenya Barris as a showrunner, and produced by Michelle Obama and Barack Obama. The song "Immigration" has a Scottish immigrant wielding a Rainbow Flag. The second half of the song "The Courts" is set at a Pride Parade and references the Obergefell v. Hodges case which made same-sex marriage legal across the United States of America. There is also LGBT icongraphy in the song "We The People." Janelle Monáe, who has said she identifies with both bisexuality and pansexuality. and pushes the "boundaries of gender," performed a number of songs for the series. This included a reggae-influenced number, titled "Stronger," which focuses on the "fight for justice and unity...unity, liberty and equality" and the title track for the series.

Ridley Jones, which ran from July 2021 to March 2023, included Ismat's fathers, Aten and Kosi. They are voiced by gay actors Andrew Rannells and Chris Colfer. The series was part of a slate of animated preschool series on the streaming service, with others including Spirit Rangers and Ada Twist, Scientist, of which Nee is the showrunner. The series includes Fred, a non-binary bison who prefers they/them pronouns, the first non-binary character in a kids show on Netflix. Fred is voiced by non-binary actor Iris Menas as confirmed by Nee.

Appearing in Q-Force, which aired in September 2021, Deb is a mechanic and guru with gadgets. She has a wife, 16 rescue dogs, and pretends to work at a place called Pep Boys when not part of the Q-Force. She is voiced by lesbian actress Wanda Sykes. The protagonist of the same series, who leads a "team of fellow LGBTQ super-spies", is Steve Maryweather. Otherwise known as Agency Mary, he heads a team of LGBTQ spies, consists of a drag disguise master (Twink), a skilled mechanic (Deb), and a hacker (Stat), later working with a straight man named Agent Buck. He is voiced by Sean Hayes, a gay actor who is the show's creator. Benji is a gay man who is the love interest of Mary and is often in danger due to his closeness to the Q-Force.

The series Carmen Sandiego featured Le Chevre and El Topo who were members of V.I.L.E until the series finale. In September 2021, the show creator, Duane Capizzi, confirmed that Le Chevre and El Topo were a gay couple. Previously, a show animator, in May 2021, stated that they were given "explicit directions to make Jeantonio romantic and intimate" in the scenes they animated.

Chicago Party Aunt, based on a Twitter account of the same name, premiered on September 17, 2021. The series features two gay characters Diane Dubrowski's nephew Duncan and Gideon, Diane's boss at Borough. In the second season, Daniel gets a boyfriend. Daniel is voiced by gay actor Rory O'Malley and Gideon is voiced by gay actor and drag queen RuPaul Charles.

On November 7, 2021, Arcane, aimed at a "16+" audience like the League of Legends video game it is based on, premiered on Netflix. In the series, Caitlyn Kiramman, a recurring character, is attracted to Vi, a woman from the undercity, despite their different circumstances. Show writer Amanda Overton said that the relationship between Caitlyn and Vi is "naturally developing," with writers honoring the lived experiences of both characters. Overton said that in Piltover, where Caitlyn lives, there is no word for describing those who are gay or any homophobia, meaning that Caitlyn could "marry any gender or race suitor," with such a person becoming "part of her house." Additionally, in the episode "Everybody Wants to Be My Enemy", Vi tells Caitlyn "you’re hot, Cupcake." Overton said that this line was added to bring clarity to her character and showed that she loves women. In the show's ninth episode, Vi's sister, Jinx, describes Caitlyn as Vi's girlfriend, and Vi becomes closer to Caitlyn. The show was renewed for a second season on November 20.

The fifth and final season of F is for Family introduced Louis, Sue's gay brother who was previously mentioned in earlier seasons. Louis is voiced by gay actor Neil Patrick Harris.

On February 3, 2022, the creator of Kid Cosmic, Craig McCracken, confirmed Fry and Hamburg a gay couple. On Instagram, a post says how he and Fry met and answered by Craig.

Human Resources began airing in March 2022. The series features Nadja el-Khoury, Natalie's older sister and Danielle who are a couple. Nadja and Danielle are voiced by queer actresses Sabrina Jalees and Ariana DeBose. Battle Kitty, which began airing in April 2022, features two gay characters Orc and Iago. Orc is Kitty's best friend and he is in love with Iago. They eventually become a couple. Battle Kitty is being nominated for a GLAAD Award for Outstanding Kids & Family Programming.

Margaret Evans interviewed Hamish Steele, creator of Dead End: Paranormal Park (formerly DeadEndia) about LGBTQ characters in his show, on August 17, 2020, before the show's premiere on June 16, 2022. Steele explained how the show changed from its original iteration on Cartoon Hangover in 2014, and the graphic novels that followed it, stating that he is grateful for showrunners who fought for LGBTQ characters in their shows, adding that there was "absolutely no pushback from Netflix about representation," while describing Barney as a trans male character. He also hoped that the show will help out "more trans creators getting their chance to tell their stories" while hinting at other LGBTQ characters in the show apart from Barney, noting the performance of Miss Coco Peru on the show as Pauline. The show also features Alex Brightman as Pugsley, Emily Osment as Courtney, and Kathreen Khavari as Badyah. Barney is also gay as he gets into a same-sex relationship with Logan "Logs" Nguyen. Logs' mother is unaware Logs is gay. The series also includes Norma who is a bisexual woman who had a crush on her straight friend Badyah and Courtney who is non-binary and accepts any pronouns. Zagan was confirmed to be a transgender woman by series creator Hamish Steele. Zagan is voiced by transgender actress and singer Michaela Jaé Rodriguez.

Jurassic World Camp Cretaceous features Yasmina "Yaz" Fadoula and Sammy Gutierrez who confessed their feelings to each other in the fifth and final season. Yaz is bisexual while Sammy is a lesbian. Yasmina is voiced by queer actress Kausar Mohammed. The series is being nominated for a GLAAD Award for Outstanding Kids & Family Programming.

On October 28, 2022, the animated film Wendell & Wild was released on Netflix. The film features Raúl Cocolotl, a transgender boy in an all-girls Catholic school. He is the first transgender male character in a major animated film. Raúl is voiced by transgender actor Sam Zelaya. The film is nominated for a GLAAD Award for Outstanding Film - Limited Release.

In The Dragon Prince season four premiere "Rebirthday", Janai proposes to Amaya through slightly incorrect sign language. The fourth season also introduces Claudia's elf boyfriend Terry who is a transgender man. Terry is voiced by transgender actor Benjamin Callins. The series is being nominated for a GLAAD Media Award for Outstanding Kids & Family Programming - Animated.

Dragon Age: Absolution began airing on Netflix in December 2022. The series features two same-sex relationships between the main characters: Miriam and Hira, and Roland and Lacklon.

On January 13, 2023, Hamish Steele, creator of Dead End: Paranormal Park announced that Netflix had cancelled the series. Five days after the cancellation, the series receive a nomination for Outstanding Kids & Family Programming - Animated.

On January 30, 2023, Princess Power was released on Netflix. The series features Beatrice "Bea" Blueberry's fathers King Barton Blueberry and Sir Benedict Blueberry. King Barton is voiced by gay actor Andrew Rannells while Sir Benedict is voiced by gay fashion designer and television personality Tan France.

Work conditions

On March 29, 2022, ND Stevenson, the showrunner and creator of She-Ra and the Princesses of Power said that the working conditions for the series were not ideal, saying that Netflix exploited the passion of those on the crew "as an excuse to underpay, understaff, and overwork," responding to a tweet from Jeff Bennett, a storyboarder and director for the series. Stevenson and Bennett both called on supporting The Animation Guild negotiators and workers in the animation industry in "their fight for better conditions."

See also
 LGBT representation in children's television
 LGBT representation in animated web series
 LGBT representation in American adult animation
 Cartoon Network and LGBT representation
 Disney and LGBT representation in animation
 List of LGBT-related films by year
 Cross-dressing in film and television
 List of animated series with crossdressing characters
 List of animated films with LGBT characters
 List of lesbian characters in animation
 List of gay characters in animation
 List of bisexual characters in animation
 List of fictional pansexual characters
 List of fictional trans characters
 List of fictional non-binary characters
 List of fictional asexual characters
 List of fictional intersex characters

Notes

References

Citations

Sources
 
 
 
 
 

Netflix
2010s animated television series
2020s animated television series
Animated television series
LGBT portrayals in mass media
LGBT-related animation